Military branches:
No regular military force; the Special Service Unit, and the Coast Guard, are both under the command of the Royal Saint Lucia Police.

Manpower available for military service: 
Males age 16-49: 41,414 (2010 est.)

Manpower fit for military service: 
Males age 16-49: 32,688; Females age 16-49: 36,289 (2010 est.)

Manpower reaching militarily significant age annually:
Male: 1,574; female: 1,502 (2010 est.)

Active Manpower:
Approximately 116 men and women

Military expenditures - dollar figure:
$5 million (fiscal year 91/92)

Military expenditures - percent of gross domestic product:
2 % (fiscal year 91/92)

Military partner: The Royal Saint Lucia Police Force receives training from the USSOUTHCOM. The United States Armed Forces considers St. Lucia as a partner nation in the Caribbean, along with Saint Vincent and the Grenadines.

See also
Saint Lucia
Royal Saint Lucia Police 
List of countries without armed forces
 Regional Security System

References

External links
Homepage of the Royal Saint Lucia Police Force
Report of a raid of the Saint Lucian Police Force
Pictures of the Saint Lucian Coast Guard Picture 1 Picture 2 Picture 3
 Pictures of US-soldiers deployed to Saint Lucia during Operation New Horizons (2001) Picture 1 Picture 2